The Royal Life Saving Society of Australia (RLSSA) is a water safety, swimming and lifesaving education organisation in Australia. RLSSA provides courses in water safety, lifesaving and resuscitation.

See also 
Royal Life Saving Society UK
Royal Life Saving Society of Canada
Surf Life Saving Australia
Ithaca–Caloundra City Life Saving Club

External links 
Official website

Surf lifesaving
Lifesaving organizations
Australian Water Safety Council members
Lifesaving in Australia
Water sports in Australia